Floscopa mannii is a species of plant in the family Commelinaceae. It is native to Cameroon and Nigeria. It grows in swampy forest habitat. It is known from very few collections.

References

mannii
Endangered plants
Flora of Cameroon
Flora of Nigeria
Taxonomy articles created by Polbot